Serhiy Oleksandrovich Boyko (born 6 August 1987) is a former Ukrainian football player.

References

1987 births
Living people
Ukrainian footballers
FC Dnipro-2 Dnipropetrovsk players
FC Akhmat Grozny players
Russian Premier League players
Ukrainian expatriate footballers
Expatriate footballers in Russia
FC Helios Kharkiv players
FC Ros Bila Tserkva players
FC Zimbru Chișinău players
Expatriate footballers in Moldova
FC Krymteplytsia Molodizhne players
FC Hoverla Uzhhorod players
Ukrainian Premier League players

Association football defenders